Piedras Negras Ruler C was a king of that Maya city-state. He was the fourth ruler of Piedras Negras, the successor of Turtle Tooth, who could be his father.

He is depicted on Panel 12. In the figural scene, Ruler C stands over three kneeling captives, one of whom is Knot-eye Jaguar I of Yaxchilan, who had captured a vassal of Turtle Tooth around 508. Another of the Panel 12 captives is from Santa Elena.

His successor was K'inich Yo'nal Ahk I. It is unknown if he was a son of Ruler C.

Notes

Kings of Piedras Negras
6th-century monarchs in North America
6th century in the Maya civilization